George William M. Pearson (21 September 1907 – unknown) was an English footballer who played as a winger.

Club career
Born in West Stanley, Pearson started as a coalminer before joining Bury in 1924. After failing to break into the first team, he left for Chelsea a year later. After seven years in Chelsea's first team, where he amassed over 200 appearances in all competitions, he moved to Luton Town in 1933. He made fourteen appearances in the league for Luton, scoring once.

References

1907 births
Date of death unknown
People from Stanley, County Durham
Footballers from County Durham
English footballers
Association football forwards
West Stanley F.C. players
Annfield Plain F.C. players
Chelsea F.C. players
Luton Town F.C. players
Walsall F.C. players